Bob Welch: His Fleetwood Mac Years & Beyond Vol. 2 was an album of re-recordings of songs by former Fleetwood Mac guitarist turned solo artist Bob Welch, released in 2006 as a follow-up to the 2003 album His Fleetwood Mac Years & Beyond. This album contained six brand new songs in addition to re-recordings of two of Welch's earlier solo tracks, three Fleetwood Mac tracks from before and after Welch's tenure in the group. There were also re-recordings of three songs Welch had recorded while in the group albeit two of them only appeared on the digital edition.

Track listing

Credits 

Bob Welch : All vocals and instruments

Production

 Produced by Bob Welch

References 

2006 albums
Bob Welch (musician) albums